Makuta may refer to:

 Makuṭa, royal headgear in Southeast Asia
 Makuta (drum), tall cylindrical or barrel-shaped Afro-Cuban drums
 Makuta VFX, Indian visual effects and animation company in California
 Makuta, Botswana, a village
 Makuta, Malawi, a village
 Makuta Station, a train station in Kisarazu, Chiba Prefecture, Japan
 Manuha (a.k.a. Makuta), the last king of the Thaton Kingdom
 Makuta, a denomination of the Zairean zaire
 Makuta, a central villain and species from the Lego Bionicle Franchise